Adrienne Fazan (May 9, 1906 – August 23, 1986) was an award-winning American film editor who first started cutting films in 1933. She worked on many MGM films, including The Tell-Tale Heart (1941), Anchors Aweigh (1945), Singin' in the Rain (1952), and Kismet (1955).

Biography 
Fazan was born in Germany, to John Fazan and Magdalena Fremdling. She became a naturalized U.S. citizen in 1923, and by 1930 was living in Los Angeles and working as a film editor at a studio.

Career 
Adrienne Fazan started cutting and editing in films in 1933 and then she went to work at MGM, who were known for hiring the most qualified and talented people.

Fazan worked with Dorothy Arzner (known for her work on many popular films like The Wild Party) on many of her films where she helped Fazan move from working on short films, to editing popular feature films. Fazan also collaborated with Vincente Minnelli on eleven films, including the Oscar winning film, Gigi.

Fazan was nominated for the Academy Award for Best Film Editing for An American in Paris (1951), and received the award for Gigi (1958). Both of these films were directed by Vincente Minnelli, with whom Fazan collaborated on 11 films. She retired in 1970 after editing The Cheyenne Social Club.

Films Edited 
 The Bride Wore Red (1937): Directed by Dorothy Arzner
 The Tell-Tale Heart (1941): Directed by Jules Dassin
 Anchors Aweigh (1945): Directed by George Sidney
 An American in Paris (1951): Directed by Vincente Minnelli
 Singin' in the Rain (1952): Directed by Gene Kelly and Stanley Donen
 Lust for Life (1956): Directed by Vincente Minnelli 
 Gigi (1958): Directed by Vincente Minnelli 
 The Cheyenne Social Club (1970): Directed by Gene Kelly

See also
List of film director and editor collaborations

References

External links

1906 births
1986 deaths
American film editors
Best Film Editing Academy Award winners
American women film editors
German emigrants to the United States